Albert "Caesar" Tocco (August 9, 1929 – September 21, 2005), was a high-ranking member of the Chicago Outfit during the 1970s and 1980s. He was the mob boss of Chicago Heights, the south suburbs, and parts of Northern Indiana.

Tocco was described as second-in-command to Alfred Pilotto, leader of the Chicago Heights Street Crew. He allegedly played a part in the murder of William Dauber, and James "Jimmy The Bomber" Catuara. He would later run the street crew in his own right upon Pilotto's retirement. He, along with Albert "Nicky" Guzzino, Albert "Chicky" Roviaro and Dominick Palermo, is alleged to have botched the burial of Michael and Tony Spilotro. This resulted in him hiding abroad for a while before getting word that Joseph Ferriola forgave him. 

On May 14, 1990, Tocco was sentenced to 200 years in prison for racketeering, conspiracy, extortion and tax fraud, after a trial in which his wife, Betty, testified against him. She testified that in 1986 she drove her husband from an Indiana cornfield where he told her he had just buried Anthony Spilotro. Betty is believed to be the first wife of an organized crime leader to testify against her husband, and she reportedly entered the federal witness protection program. With Tocco in prison, Dominick Palermo briefly took over the Chicago Heights operations before his 1991 conviction for extorting protection money.Tocco died of a stroke at the age of 76, on September 21, 2005, in prison in Terre Haute, Indiana.

References

External links
 
  

1929 births
2005 deaths
American gangsters of Italian descent
Chicago Outfit mobsters
American people convicted of tax crimes
People convicted of racketeering
Mafia extortionists
American people who died in prison custody
Prisoners who died in United States federal government detention